A reversible hydrogen electrode (RHE) is a reference electrode, more specifically a subtype of the standard hydrogen electrodes, for electrochemical processes. Unlike the standard hydrogen electrode, its measured potential does change with the pH, so it can be directly used in the electrolyte.

The name refers to the fact that the electrode is directly immersed in the actual electrolyte solution and not separated by a salt bridge. The hydrogen ion concentration is therefore not 1 mol/L, or 1 mol/kg, but corresponds to that of the electrolyte solution. In this way, it is possible to achieve a stable potential with a changing pH value. The potential of the RHE correlates to the pH value:
 

In general, for a hydrogen electrode in which the reduction of the hydronium ions occurs:

  {2H3O+} + {2e^-} <=> {H2} + {2H2O}

or, more often commonly written simply with  denoting : 

  {2H+} + {2e^-} <=> {H2}

with,
 

the equilibrium potential  depends on the hydrogen pressure  and the activity  as follows:

 

 

 

 

An overpotential occurs in the electrolysis of water. This means that the required cell voltage is higher than the equilibrium potential because of kinetic limitations. The potential increases with increasing current density at the electrodes. The measurement of equilibrium potentials is therefore possible without power.

Principle
The reversible hydrogen electrode is a fairly practical and reproducible electrode "standard". The term refers to a hydrogen electrode immersed in the electrolyte solution actually used.

The benefit of that electrode is that no salt bridge is needed:
 no contamination of the electrolyte by chlorides or sulfates
 no diffusion potentials at the electrolyte bridge (liquid junction potential). This is important at temperature different to 25 °C.
 long time measurements possible (no electrolyte bridge means no maintenance of the bridge)

See also
Dynamic hydrogen electrode
Palladium-hydrogen electrode

References

Electrodes
Hydrogen technologies

ja:基準電極#可逆水素電極